The Heck's macaque (Macaca hecki) is a macaque of Sulawesi, Indonesia. This Old World monkey is diurnal.

It feeds on fruits.

References

External links
Photos at ARKive.

Heck's macaque
Primates of Indonesia
Mammals of Sulawesi
Heck's macaque
Taxa named by Paul Matschie